Allium roseum, commonly called rosy garlic, is an edible, Old World species of wild garlic. It is native to the Mediterranean region and nearby areas, with a natural range extending from Portugal and Morocco to Turkey and the Palestine region. It is cultivated widely, and has become naturalised in scattered locations in other regions outside its natural range.

Description 

The inflorescences of A. roseum are umbels.

The smell and flavour of the bulb is powerful enough to drive squirrels and browsing deer away from gardens, where they are planted as ornamental flowers. For this reason, they are suitable as companion plants to tulips and similar species.

Taxonomy
Allium roseum was originally described and published by Carl Linnaeus in his  in 1753.

Subspecies + varieties
Numerous names have been proposed at the subspecies and varietal levels within the species, but only a few are currently accepted:
 Allium roseum subsp. gulekense Koyuncu & Eker - Turkey
 Allium roseum subsp. roseum - most of species range
 Allium roseum var. roseum - most of species range
 Allium roseum var. tourneuxii Boiss. - Israel, Palestine, Egypt, Libya, Tunisia, Algeria

formerly included
 Allium roseum var. cassium, now called Allium cassium 
 Allium roseum subsp. permixtum, now called Allium permixtum 
 Allium roseum subsp. persicum, now called Allium tripedale
 Allium roseum var. puberulum, now called Allium cassium

References

External links
 
 

roseum
Garlic
Plants described in 1753
Taxa named by Carl Linnaeus
Garden plants of Europe
Plant toxin insecticides